Đồng Hải is an urban ward (phường) in Đồng Hới, Quảng Bình Province, in Vietnam. It covers an area of 1.93 km2 and has a population of 5,957.

Populated places in Quảng Bình province
Communes of Quảng Bình province